Bhanu Pratap Shahi  is a member of Bharatiya Janata Party and member of Jharkhand Legislative Assembly.

References

Jharkhand MLAs 2014–2019
Corruption in Jharkhand
Living people
Jharkhand Party politicians
Year of birth missing (living people)
Jharkhand MLAs 2005–2009
Jharkhand MLAs 2019–2024
Bharatiya Janata Party politicians from Jharkhand
All India Forward Bloc politicians